The 1939 Chicago Bears season was their 20th regular season completed in the National Football League. They finished second in the Western Division with an 8–3 record. The Bears started the season well, winning 4 of their first 5 games. However, two mid-season losses to New York and Detroit cost them the Division to Green Bay. The Packers went on to win the NFL championship.

Season highlights
The Bears were much improved from 1938, adding two new players who contributed immediately and would be part of the great Chicago teams of the 1940s. Overall, the Bears had a potent offense, leading the NFL in scoring, touchdowns, total yards (averaging 364 yards per game), rushing yards, rushing average per carry, rushing touchdowns, passing yards, and passing yards per attempt. Perhaps most impressively, the club led the NFL with a gaudy 22.1 average yards per pass completion. The T-formation was beginning to demonstrate itself as a superior passing scheme, particularly regarding the deep game.

Luckman Arrives
Sid Luckman was a Single Wing tailback at Columbia University before joining the Bears. Coach Halas traded with Pittsburgh for the rights to Luckman, seeing potential to run the complicated T-formation in the relatively unknown player. It took a $5,000 bonus to convince Luckman to sign with the Bears. Bernie Masterson continued to be the primary quarterback, but Luckman played more in the second half of the season. Luckman was a more accurate passer than Masterson, with a flair for the long ball. His first NFL touchdown pass was a 68-yard bomb to Dick Plasman in the fourth quarter of the October 22 game against the Giants, a game the Bears lost despite Luckman leading a furious fourth quarter comeback. By the end of the year, Luckman was playing in the first half ahead of Masterson; he finished the season with 636 yards passing, completing 23 of 51 attempts, with 5 touchdowns and 4 interceptions. He also had an interception return for a touchdown.

Osmanski
The other major rookie performer was Bill Osmanski from Holy Cross, a hard-running fullback who led the league in rushing with 699 yards, averaging 5.8 yards per carry and finishing with 7 rushing touchdowns. Osmanski possessed great speed and was a threat to go all the way from anywhere on the field; he burned the Cardinals with an 86-yard run and the Eagles with a 65-yard scamper. Osmanski's arrival freed up running room for Joe Maniaci, who averaged 7.1 yards per carry for his 544 yards.

Other top performances
Dick Plasman and Les McDonald continued to play well at end, combining for 35 receptions and 6 touchdowns. Jack Manders continued to kick well in his last season and led the team in scoring. The interior line continued to be strong, with Bausch, Fortmann, Stydahar, and Musso representing one of the strongest units in football. The defense fell down a bit this season, and probably cost the Bears the division, allowing 157 points including more than 20 four times. The pieces were almost in place for the Bears to dominate the league, but that would have to wait for the next decade.

Future Hall of Fame players
Dan Fortmann, guard
Sid Luckman, quarterback (rookie from Columbia University)
George Musso, guard
Joe Stydahar, tackle

Other leading players
Frank Bausch, center
Jack Manders, fullback/kicker
Joe Maniaci, back
Bernie Masterson, quarterback
Les McDonald, end
Ray Nolting, halfback
Bill Osmanski, fullback (rookie from Holy Cross)
Richard Plasman, end

Schedule

Standings

Chicago Bears
Chicago Bears seasons
Chicago Bears